Juan Francisco Sandoval Alfaro (born in 1982) is a Guatemalan lawyer and prosecutor who served as Head of the Special Prosecutor's Office against Impunity from September 2015 to July 2021.

Biography 
Sandoval was an ally of then-Attorney General Thelma Aldana in investigating cases against former presidents Alfonso Portillo, Álvaro Arzú, Álvaro Colom and Otto Pérez Molina, among other cases. After Aldana's mandate, Sandoval began investigations for possible corruption against former president Jimmy Morales and current president Alejandro Giammattei.

Sandoval maintained a strained relationship with Aldana's successor, María Consuelo Porras, who eventually ended up removing him in July 2021. According to the US State Department, Porras "actively undermined" the corruption investigations conducted by Sandoval and his team. About two months after her removal, the US Department of State included María Consuelo Porras on a list of "corrupt and undemocratic" officials.

References 

Living people
21st-century Guatemalan lawyers
1982 births